Tiruturaipundi Junction railway station is a junction railway station serving the town of Thiruthuraipoondi in Tamil Nadu, India.

The station is a part of the Tiruchirapalli railway division of the Southern Railway zone It is also officially known by its code: TTP.

Location and layout
The railway station is located off the State Highway 63 or Railway Station Road, of Thiruthuraipoondi.
The station has three platforms and over five tracks in broad gauge.

Lines

Metre gauge
The century-old metre-gauge line was laid by the British and the first train was operated on 20 October 1902.
The last train on the metre-gauge from Thiruvarur started at 8 pm on 18 October 2012 and completed its journey at Thiruthuraipoondi at 8:45 pm, This was the last metre-gauge section to be upgraded into broad-gauge segment by the Southern Railway. All of eleven stations were closed from 19 October 2012.

Gauge conversion
The after-conversion work of the Thiruvarur–Karaikudi broad-gauge section was opened to traffic in 2019. Gauge conversion between Tiruturaipundi Junction railway station and Agasthiyampalli railway line is in progress. It is the last railway junction to be completely converted to broad gauge from meter gauge as all remaining railway junctions(not to be confused with railway station) were converted into broad gauge in Tamil Nadu as well as in southern railway zone before the works at tiruturaipoondi junction gets completed.

Services
The DEMU Passenger special services introduced between Tiruvarur and Karaikkudi by the Southern Railway on 1 June 2019.

ERS - NGT SPL Bi Weekly Express operated from 04-June-2022 between Ernakulam–Velankanni, via Kottayam, Changanassery, Kayamkulam, Kollam, Sengottai, Sivakasi, Virudhunagar, 
Karaikudi, Pattukkottai, Thiruthuraipoondi, Thiruvarur, Nagapattinam and Southern Railway planned to operate passenger services between Tambaram–Sengottai via Viluppuram–Mayiladuthurai–Thiruvarur–Thiruthuraipoondi–Pattukkottai–Karaikudi–Tirunelveli–Tenkasi.

Timetable

References

External links
 

Trichy railway division
Railway stations in Thiruvarur district
Railway junction stations in Tamil Nadu